Anthony Roy "Jim" Dewes (born 2 June 1957) is an English former cricketer.

The son of the Test cricketer John Dewes, who played for England between 1948–50, Dewes was born in June 1957 at Rugby, Warwickshire. He was educated at Dulwich College, where his father taught, before going up to St John's College, Cambridge. While studying at Cambridge, he made his debut in first-class cricket for Cambridge University against Surrey at Fenner's in 1978. He played first-class cricket for Cambridge until 1979, making fourteen appearances. In his fourteen matches, he scored a total of 368 runs at an average of 18.40 and a high score of 84. In addition to playing first-class cricket while at Cambridge, he also made a single List A one-day appearance for the Combined Universities cricket team against Northamptonshire in the 1979 Benson & Hedges Cup, during which he was dismissed without scoring by Tim Lamb. After graduating from Cambridge, he became a schoolteacher. He currently teaches geography at Wellington College, Berkshire. His sons, Jonathan and Adam Dewes, have also played first-class cricket.

References

External links

1957 births
Living people
Sportspeople from Rugby, Warwickshire
People educated at Dulwich College
Alumni of St John's College, Cambridge
English cricketers
Cambridge University cricketers
British Universities cricketers
Schoolteachers from Berkshire